Jarno Gmelich Meijling (born 21 June 1989 in Almere) is a Dutch cyclist, who currently rides for Dutch amateur team Allinq–Krush WV IJsselstreek.

Major results

2007
 2nd Time trial, National Junior Road Championships
2009
 6th Overall Tour du Haut-Anjou
2010
 2nd Ronde van Midden-Nederland
 3rd Overall Mainfranken-Tour
1st Prologue
 5th Overall Tour de Berlin
2011
 8th Overall Kreiz Breizh Elites
2012
 10th Scandinavian Race Uppsala
2013
 5th Overall Circuit des Ardennes
 6th Gran Premio San Giuseppe
2014
 1st Stage 1 (TTT) Okolo Slovenska
 6th Overall Czech Cycling Tour
1st Stage 1 (TTT)
 8th Overall Kreiz Breizh Elites
 8th Omloop der Kempen
2015
 7th Gooikse Pijl
 8th Overall Volta ao Alentejo
 8th Hadeland GP
2016
 1st Stage 4 Volta ao Alentejo
 4th Overall Kreiz Breizh Elites
2017
 4th De Kustpijl
 5th Overall Course de la Solidarité Olympique

References

External links

1989 births
Living people
Dutch male cyclists
Sportspeople from Almere
20th-century Dutch people
21st-century Dutch people